Krasny Liman is a rural locality (a selo) and the administrative center of Krasnolimanskoye Rural Settlement, Paninsky District, Voronezh Oblast, Russia. The population was 749 as of 2010. There are 10 streets.

Geography 
Krasny Liman is located on the Tamlyk River, 27 km southwest of Panino (the district's administrative centre) by road. Barsuchye is the nearest rural locality.

References 

Rural localities in Paninsky District